Crews are bodies or classes of people who work at a common activity.

Crews may also refer to:

Crews (surname)
 Louis Crews Stadium in Huntsville, Alabama, USA
 Alton C. Crews Middle School in Gwinnett County, Georgia, USA

See also
Crew (disambiguation)